Avon may refer to:

River Avon (disambiguation), several rivers

Organisations
Avon Buses, a bus operating company in Wirral, England
Avon Coachworks, a car body builder established in 1919 at Warwick, England, relaunched in 1922, following refinancing, as New Avon
Avon Inflatables, a manufacturer of inflatable boats, RIBs and marine safety equipment
Avon Products, a manufacturer of various cosmetics and personal care products
Avon (publisher), an imprint of the publisher HarperCollins
Avon Rubber, a manufacturer of rubber products
Avon Tyres, a UK car, motorcycle and racing-tyre manufacturer, owned by the Cooper Tire & Rubber Company
Avon and Somerset Police, a police department in the United Kingdom

People
John Avon (born 1961), Welsh illustrator
Avon Cobourne (born 1979), American football running back
Anthony Eden (1897–1977), Earl of Avon
Avon Honey (1947–2010), American politician from Louisiana
Avon Long (1910–1984), American singer and actor
Avon Riley (born 1958), American football linebacker
Avon Williams (1921–1993), American politician from Tennessee

Fictional characters
Justin Alastair, Duke of Avon in the novel These Old Shades by Georgette Heyer
Kerr Avon, a character in the science-fiction television series Blake's 7 
Avon Barksdale, a character in the HBO television series The Wire

Places

Australia
Electoral district of Avon, a former electorate of the Western Australian Legislative Assembly
Avon, South Australia, former township between Balaclava and Long Plains

Canada
Avon, Ontario, in the province of Ontario
New Avon, New Brunswick, in the province of New Brunswick

France
Avon, Seine-et-Marne, a commune in the département of Seine-et-Marne, part of Communauté de communes de Fontainebleau-Avon
Avon, Deux-Sèvres, a commune in the département of Deux-Sèvres
Avon-la-Pèze, a commune in the département of Aube
Avon-les-Roches, a commune in the département of Indre-et-Loire

New Zealand
Avon (New Zealand electorate)

United Kingdom

Avon (county), a former county of England
Avon, a hamlet in the parish of Sopley, Hampshire
Avon, Wiltshire

United States
Avon, Alabama
Avon, Contra Costa County, California
Avon, Colorado
Avon, Connecticut
Avon, Illinois
Avon, Indiana
Avon, Iowa
Avon, Maine
Avon, Massachusetts
Avon, Minnesota, a city
Avon, Mississippi
Avon, Montana, a town
Avon (town), New York
Avon (village), New York, within the town
Avon, North Carolina
Avon, Ohio, a city
Avon, Pennsylvania, a town
Avon, South Dakota, a city
Avon, Utah, a town
Avon, Wisconsin, a town
Avon, Rock County, Wisconsin, an unincorporated community
Avon-by-the-Sea, New Jersey, a borough
Avon Lake, Ohio, a city
Avon Park, Florida, a city
Avon Township (disambiguation)

Other occurrences
Avon (ship), a ship built in 1884
HMS Avon, name given to a number British Royal Navy ships
"Avon" (song), a song by Queens of the Stone Age
"Avon 1", a song from the album A Bugged Out Mix by Miss Kittin
Rolls-Royce Avon, a jet engine

See also 
Afon, the Welsh word for river, often anglicised to 'avon'
Aberavon
Aven (disambiguation)
Avondale (disambiguation)
Avonmore (disambiguation)
Craigavon (disambiguation)
Blaenavon
Cwmavon (disambiguation)